Miche Wabun Peak is located in the Lewis Range, Glacier National Park in the U.S. state of Montana. Miche Wabun Peak is in the northeastern section of Glacier National Park and is north of Miche Wabun Lake.

See also
 Mountains and mountain ranges of Glacier National Park (U.S.)

References

Miche Wabun Peak
Mountains of Glacier National Park (U.S.)
Lewis Range
Mountains of Montana